"Hero" is a song by American indie rock band Family of the Year featured on their second studio album Loma Vista. It was released as the album's second single in 2012 through Nettwerk. The song was written by Joe Keefe, and it was produced by American production team Wax Ltd and Family of the Year. It first appeared on the band's 2010 EP Through The Trees in a shorter version. 

"Hero" was prominently used in Richard Linklater's 2014 film Boyhood as well as its trailer. The song has also been used in the first season of Girls, the 2012 film Thanks for Sharing, the 2013 German film Frau Ella and has been featured in episodes of Degrassi: The Next Generation, Korean Drama It's Okay, That's Love, Sky Castle and VH1's Couples Therapy. The band has performed the song on talk shows including Jimmy Kimmel Live!, Conan and The Tonight Show with Jay Leno. The song was covered by Owen Danoff on Team Adam in the Live Playoffs of season 10 of The Voice (US).

Track listing
European digital EP
"Hero" – 3:10
"Hero" (acoustic) – 3:13
"Buried" (acoustic) – 3:27
"She Wanted Someone Else" – 3:31

German, Austrian and Swiss CD single
"Hero" – 3:11
"Hero" (acoustic) – 3:13

Charts

Weekly charts

Year-end charts

Certifications

References

2012 singles
2012 songs
Nettwerk Records singles